Caves and Caverns is a 1982 fantasy role-playing game adventure published by Judges Guild.

Contents
Caves and Caverns is designed to be used as a universal role-playing adventure, and contains several pages of random generation tables for such things as treasure and dungeons are followed by a book full of hex maps to assist the gamemaster with a campaign or adventure.

Publication history
Caves and Caverns was written by John Mortimer, and published by Judges Guild in 1982 as a 64-page book.

Reception
Kelly Grimes reviewed Caves and Caverns in The Space Gamer No. 60. Grimes commented that "it would be wise to pass this one by. This is simply too much to pay for a very incomplete product unless you are simply desperate for hex maps."

References

Judges Guild fantasy role-playing game adventures
Role-playing game supplements introduced in 1982